Melissa Shelsie Dacius (born 24 May 1999) is a Haitian footballer who plays as a midfielder for AS Tigresses and the Haiti women's national team.

International goals
Scores and results list Haiti's goal tally first

References

External links 
 

1999 births
Living people
Women's association football midfielders
Haitian women's footballers
Haiti women's international footballers